Meitar is a small local council north-east of Beersheba, in Israel's Southern District. The town lies on Highway 60 just south of the Green Line on the southern edge of Mount Hebron, alongside the Yatir Forest. Metar is 19 km north of Beer-Sheva and is in between the two Bedouin towns of Hura and Laqiya.

With a land area of 16,696 dunams (~16.7 km2), Meitar is ranked very highly on the Israeli socio-economic scale, with a score of 9/10.

History
Meitar was founded in 1984. The area drew national attention during the Shai Dromi trial.

References

External links
Psagot elementary school in Meitar
Amit elementary school in Meitar
Meitarim High school in Meitar
Metar Sports Club

Populated places established in 1984
Local councils in Southern District (Israel)
1984 establishments in Israel